"She's Gonna Win Your Heart" is a song written by Billy Burnette and Mentor Williams, and recorded by American country music artist Eddy Raven.  It was released in November 1984 as the third single from the album I Could Use Another You.  The song reached #9 on the Billboard Hot Country Singles & Tracks chart.

Chart performance

References

1984 singles
Eddy Raven songs
Song recordings produced by Paul Worley
RCA Records singles
Songs written by Billy Burnette
Songs written by Mentor Williams
1984 songs